Senator Ackerman may refer to:

Dick Ackerman (born 1942), California State State Senate
Ernest Robinson Ackerman (1863–1931), New Jersey State Senate
Gary Ackerman (born 1942), New York State Senate